Diospage steinbachi is a moth of the subfamily Arctiinae first described by Rothschild in 1909. It is found in Bolivia.

References

Moths described in 1909
Euchromiina